Aleksandar Rakić (born February 6, 1992) is an Austrian mixed martial artist. He currently competes in the Light Heavyweight division in the Ultimate Fighting Championship (UFC). A professional since 2011, Rakić has also competed for the Final Fight Championship in his native Austria.  As of January 24, 2023, he is #4 in the UFC light heavyweight rankings.

Background
Rakić was born and raised in Vienna, Austria, into a Serb family. As a child, he played football. However, he was aggressive up to a point where he was expelled from the team. As a way to unload his excess energy, Rakić started competing in kickboxing and boxing when he was 13 years old. He accumulated over 40 fights prior to transitioning into MMA at the age of 19, as he wanted to incorporate grappling and wrestling into his fighting skills.

Mixed martial arts career

Early career 
Rakić started his professional MMA career in 2011, competing primarily in the European circuit, and amassed a record of 8–1 before being signed by the UFC in March 2017.

Ultimate Fighting Championship

Rakić made his UFC debut on September 2, 2017, against Francimar Barroso at UFC Fight Night 115 in Rotterdam, Netherlands.  He won the fight via unanimous decision.

Rakić was expected to face Gadzhimurad Antigulov on February 24, 2018, at UFC on Fox 28. However, it was reported on February 7, 2018, that Antigulov was pulled from the fight, citing injury, as a result, the bout was cancelled.

His next fight came on July 22, 2018, at UFC Fight Night 134 against Justin Ledet. He won the fight via unanimous decision.

Rakić faced Devin Clark on December 8, 2018, at UFC 231. He won the fight by TKO in the first round.

Rakić next faced Jimi Manuwa on June 1, 2019, at UFC Fight Night 153.  He won the fight by knockout with a head kick in the opening minute of the fight. The win also earned his first Performance of the Night bonus award.

Rakić faced Volkan Oezdemir on December 21, 2019, at UFC Fight Night 165 He lost the fight via split decision. 7 out of 8 media members scored the fight for Rakić.

On February 17, 2020, Rakić announced on his social media that he had signed a new, six-fight contract with the UFC.

Rakić faced Anthony Smith on August 29, 2020, at UFC Fight Night 175. He won the fight via unanimous decision.

Rakić faced Thiago Santos on March 6, 2021, at UFC 259. He won the fight via unanimous decision.

Rakić was scheduled to face former light heavyweight champion Jan Błachowicz on March 26, 2022, at UFC on ESPN 33. However, in late January, Błachowicz withdrew due to an injury and the bout was rescheduled for UFC on ESPN 36 on May 14, 2022. Rakić lost the fight via technical knockout in round three after being rendered unable to continue after tearing his anterior cruciate ligament. He hurt his knee three weeks prior to the fight during sparring.

Championships and accomplishments
Ultimate Fighting Championship
Performance of the Night (One time)

Mixed martial arts record

|-
|Loss
|align=center|14–3
|Jan Błachowicz 
|TKO (knee injury)
|UFC on ESPN: Błachowicz vs. Rakić
| 
|align=center|3
|align=center|1:11
|Las Vegas, Nevada, United States
|
|-
|Win
|align=center|14–2
|Thiago Santos
|Decision (unanimous)
|UFC 259
|
|align=center|3
|align=center|5:00
|Las Vegas, Nevada, United States
|
|-
|Win
|align=center|13–2
|Anthony Smith
|Decision (unanimous)
|UFC Fight Night: Smith vs. Rakić
|
|align=center|3
|align=center|5:00
|Las Vegas, Nevada, United States
|
|-
|Loss
|align=center|12–2
|Volkan Oezdemir
|Decision (split)
|UFC Fight Night: Edgar vs. The Korean Zombie
|
|align=center|3
|align=center|5:00
|Busan, South Korea
|
|-
|Win
|align=center|12–1
|Jimi Manuwa
|KO (head kick)
|UFC Fight Night: Gustafsson vs. Smith
|
|align=center|1
|align=center|0:42
|Stockholm, Sweden
|
|-
|Win
|align=center|11–1
|Devin Clark
|TKO (punches)
|UFC 231
|
|align=center|1
|align=center|4:05
|Toronto, Ontario, Canada
|
|-
|Win
|align=center|10–1
|Justin Ledet
|Decision (unanimous)
|UFC Fight Night: Shogun vs. Smith
|
|align=center|3
|align=center|5:00
|Hamburg, Germany
|
|-
|Win
|align=center|9–1
|Francimar Barroso
|Decision (unanimous)
|UFC Fight Night: Volkov vs. Struve
|
|align=center|3
|align=center|5:00
|Rotterdam, Netherlands
|
|-
|Win
|align=center|8–1
|Sergio Souza
|TKO (punches)
|Austrian Fight Challenge 5
|
|align=center|1
|align=center|N/A
|Vienna, Austria
|
|-
|Win
|align=center|7–1
|Martin Batur
|KO (punch)
|Austrian Fight Challenge 1
|
|align=center|1
|align=center|0:26
|Vienna, Austria
|
|-
|Win
|align=center|6–1
|Marcin Prachnio
|TKO (punches)
|Final Fight Championship 16
|
|align=center|3
|align=center|3:00
|Vienna, Austria
|
|-
|Win
|align=center|5–1
|Norbert Péter
|TKO (punches)
|HG: Heimgala 2
|
|align=center|1
|align=center|4:57
|Vienna, Austria
|
|-
|Win
|align=center|4–1
|Péter Rozmaring
|Submission (north-south choke)
|Vendetta: Rookies 2
|
|align=center|1
|align=center|1:32
|Vienna, Austria
|
|-
|Win
|align=center|3–1
|Laszlo Czene
|KO (head kick)
|WFC: Challengers 3
|
|align=center|1
|align=center|N/A
|Vienna, Austria
|
|-
|Win
|align=center|2–1
|Richard Longhimo
|TKO (punches)
|Iron Fist: Vendetta 3
|
|align=center|2
|align=center|4:30
|Vienna, Austria
|
|-
|Win
|align=center|1–1
|Carsten Lorenz
|TKO (punches)
|New Talents 15
|
|align=center|1
|align=center|1:42
|Erfurt, Germany
|
|-
|Loss
|align=center|0–1
|Christian Radke
|Submission (guillotine choke)
|Rock the Cage 2
|
|align=center|1
|align=center|4:34
|Greifswald, Germany
|
|-

See also
List of current UFC fighters
List of male mixed martial artists

References

External links
 
 

Living people
1992 births
Light heavyweight mixed martial artists
Mixed martial artists utilizing boxing
Mixed martial artists utilizing kickboxing
Mixed martial artists utilizing Brazilian jiu-jitsu
Austrian male mixed martial artists
Austrian practitioners of Brazilian jiu-jitsu
Austrian people of Serbian descent
Sportspeople from Vienna
Ultimate Fighting Championship male fighters